In baseball, hit by pitch (HBP) is a situation in which a batter or his clothing or equipment (other than his bat) is struck directly by a pitch from the pitcher; the batter is called a hit batsman (HB). A hit batsman is awarded first base, provided that (in the plate umpire's judgment) he made an honest effort to avoid the pitch, although failure to do so is rarely called by an umpire. Being hit by a pitch is often caused by a batter standing too close to, or "crowding", home plate.

This is a list of the top 100 Major League Baseball pitchers who have the most hit batsmen of all time.

Gus Weyhing (277) holds the dubious record for most hit batsmen in a career. Chick Fraser (219), Pink Hawley (210), and Walter Johnson (205) are the only other pitchers to hit 200 or more batters in their careers.

Key

List
Stats updated through the 2022 season.

See also
List of Major League Baseball career bases on balls allowed leaders

Notes

References

External links

Hit batsmen
Hit batsmen
Top sports lists